George Robert Lazenby (born 5 September 1939) is an Australian actor. He was the second actor to portray fictional British secret agent James Bond in the Eon Productions film series, playing the character in On Her Majesty's Secret Service (1969). Having appeared in only one film, Lazenby's tenure as Bond is the shortest among the actors in the series.

Beginning his professional career as a model, Lazenby had only acted in commercials when he was cast to replace original Bond actor Sean Connery. He declined to return in subsequent Bond films and instead pursued roles in films throughout the 1970s that included Universal Soldier (1971), Who Saw Her Die? (1972), The Shrine of Ultimate Bliss (1974), The Man from Hong Kong (1975) and The Kentucky Fried Movie (1977). After his career stalled during this period, he moved into business and invested in real estate.

Lazenby later appeared in roles that parodied the James Bond character. In 2017, a Hulu docudrama film, Becoming Bond, featured Lazenby recounting his life story and portrayal of Bond.

Early life 
George Robert Lazenby was born on 5 September 1939 in Goulburn, New South Wales, at Ovada Private Hospital, to railway worker George Edward Lazenby and Sheila Joan Lazenby (née Bodel), who worked at a Fosseys retail store. He went to Goulburn Public School in his primary years, and Goulburn High School until 1954. His sister, Barbara, was an accomplished dancer. When he was young he spent 18 months in hospital after having an operation which left him with only half a kidney.

When Lazenby was about 14 he moved with his family from Goulburn to Queanbeyan, where his father ran a store. He served in the Australian Army, then afterwards worked as a car salesman and mechanic.

Modelling

Lazenby moved to London in 1963 to pursue a woman with whom he'd fallen in love. He became a used-car salesman in Finchley, and subsequently sold new cars in Park Lane, where he was spotted by a talent scout who persuaded him to become a model. He was soon earning £25,000 a year (£ today). He was widely known for an advertisement for Fry's chocolate bars. In 1966, he was voted Top Model of the Year.

James Bond

In 1968, after Sean Connery had left the role of James Bond, producer Albert R. Broccoli met Lazenby for the first time while they were getting their hair cut at the same barbershop. Broccoli later saw him in the Big Fry commercial and felt he could possibly be a Bond, on which basis he invited him to do a screen test.

Lazenby dressed for the part by sporting several sartorial Bond elements such as a Rolex Submariner wristwatch and a Savile Row suit, which had been ordered, but not collected, by Connery.

Broccoli offered him an audition. The position was consolidated when Lazenby accidentally punched a professional wrestler, who was acting as stunt coordinator, in the face, impressing Broccoli with his ability to display aggression. Director Peter R. Hunt later said:

In July 1969, after making On Her Majesty's Secret Service, Lazenby returned home to Queanbeyan to see his parents. He said he had 18 films to consider. "But it's all commercial rubbish, such as the guy getting the girl at the end of the Battle of Britain," he said. "I'll just have to wait and see." He also told the press "I don't think I'm ready for anything like Hamlet yet but I'd love to play Ned Kelly." 

Lazenby said he intended to make the next Bond film, which was to be The Man with the Golden Gun. However, by November 1969, and prior to the release of OHMSS, Lazenby said he no longer wished to play another Bond role, saying, "The producers made me feel like I was mindless. They disregarded everything I suggested simply because I hadn't been in the film business like them for about a thousand years." His co-star Diana Rigg was among many who commented on this decision:

Rigg was also quoted as saying, "I can no longer cater for his obsession with himself. He is utterly, unbelievably ... bloody impossible."

"I draw a veil over the chap," said Desmond Llewelyn (who played Q in 17 Bond films). "How can you expect someone who's never acted before ... to take on a leading role?"

Lazenby grew a beard and long hair. "Bond is a brute ... I've already put him behind me. I will never play him again. Peace – that's the message now," he announced.

He said: 

He later elaborated:

At the time of the release of OHMSS, Lazenby's performance received mixed reviews. Some felt that, while he was physically convincing, some of his costumes were inappropriate – "too loud" according to some – and that he delivered his lines poorly.

Others, however, have developed differing views in the decades since the film. In the 1998 book The Essential James Bond, Lee Pfeiffer and Dave Worrell write:

Roger Moore made reference to Lazenby in his commentary for a 2007 DVD release of The Man with the Golden Gun: Lazenby was told by Connery in a restaurant "you were good".

Broccoli told the press shortly after the film's release:

Broccoli did admit that he found Lazenby's post-movie attitude annoying:

Although Lazenby had been offered a contract for seven movies, his agent, Ronan O'Rahilly, convinced him that the secret agent would be archaic in the liberated 1970s, and as a result he left the series after the release of On Her Majesty's Secret Service in 1969. After this role, Lazenby is claimed to have begun studying drama at Durham University's College of the Venerable Bede. though this was not reported on at the time.

Lazenby has portrayed James Bond several times over the years in numerous parodies and unofficial 007 roles, notably the 1983 television film The Return of the Man from U.N.C.L.E. (in which his character is identified only by the initials J.B.), 1996 video game Fox Hunt (parts of which were reedited into a feature film) and an episode of The New Alfred Hitchcock Presents, entitled "Diamonds Aren't Forever". In 2012 Lazenby made a guest appearance on the Canadian sketch comedy series This Hour Has 22 Minutes, spoofing the 007 series in a skit called "Help, I've Skyfallen and I Can't Get Up". Lazenby was complimentary of the finished film in later years; "In retrospect it was well done. I can’t say I was Richard Burton, or a great actor in it because it was my first acting experience, but I did carry the role. It was tough carrying the role after Sean Connery because he was good. I liked him. You’ve got to understand the story was good, and it had some substance while most of them, I hate to say, don’t."

Post-Bond career
For a time there was some talk Lazenby would appear in a western, Deakin. He talked to the press about his use of LSD and marijuana and was involved in a well-publicised incident helping a friend who was arrested in Germany. He grew his hair and a moustache and talked about rejecting the "trappings of materialism".

Lazenby made another film a year after On Her Majesty's Secret Service – Universal Soldier (1971), which he helped write. He said the movie was "anti-guns and anti-Bond... a [comedy] with no plot. It is really just a series of happenings which keep the audience entertained. This is the kind of film which is coming out in Europe now."

"After the Bond fiasco nobody would touch me," admitted Lazenby. "Harry Saltzman had always said, 'If you don't do another Bond you'll wind up doing spaghetti westerns in Italy. But I couldn't even get one of those. My agent couldn't believe it. But the word was out – I was 'difficult'."

Lazenby next appeared in the 1972 Italian giallo film Who Saw Her Die? opposite Anita Strindberg, a performance for which he lost 35 pounds and received positive reviews. He spent the next 15 months sailing around the world with Chrissie Townson which ended when she became pregnant with their first child, prompting Lazenby to settle down and try to re-activate his career as an actor.

In February 1973, he revealed that he had spent all of the money he had earned from playing Bond, had experienced two nervous breakdowns and had become an alcoholic. He said if he had not left the role he would have been "locked up by now... You need mental conditioning to play Bond", he added. "I burnt some bridges behind me, and it was fun, really. I'm sort of glad I did it and I know I won't have to do it again. I can look back and laugh because I didn't hurt anyone — except myself."

Lazenby played a role in the BBC's Play For Today series in 1973, starring in Roger Smith's The Operation. He was meant to follow it with an Anglo-Italian western made in Turkey, followed by a film about rioting students in pre-Castro Cuba, but neither was made.

Hong Kong
In 1973, Lazenby said he was "flat broke" when he went to Hong Kong to meet Bruce Lee and producer Raymond Chow. They ended up offering him $10,000 ($ today) to appear in a film with Lee, which was going to be the Golden Harvest film Game of Death. However this collapsed after Lee's sudden death – Lazenby was actually meant to meet Lee for lunch on the day Lee died.

Instead it was announced Lazenby would make The Golden Needles of Ecstasy for Golden Harvest. "I'm excited to be able to concentrate on just acting in this film," he said. "On Universal Soldier I was involved in the production, the writing and even a bit in direction. I don't think I'm a good enough actor to get fragmented like that on a job. Now I can give my full concentration to acting. I hope it will be good and lead to other roles."

He revealed he had been consulting an astrologer for four years. "Even before I made the Bond picture she said I would become famous, and that there would be big problems for a couple of years," he said. "Then she assured me that I would be back at the top of my profession by the end of 1973. It's absolutely fantastic, because everything she has told me has happened."

In the end, Lazenby did not make Golden Needles but shot three other films for Golden Harvest, Stoner (1974) (aka The Shrine of Ultimate Bliss), The Man from Hong Kong (1975) (also known as The Dragon Flies), and A Queen's Ransom (1976).

Australia
In the mid-1970s, he appeared in a number of television movies shot in his native Australia, and an episode of the local police drama series Matlock Police. He also returned to modelling, appearing in a number of advertisements for Benson and Hedges cigarettes.

A few years later he told an Australian magazine, "I got a few roles but nothing spectacular, yet I was ready, willing and able to work. I just don't think I'm going to make it here. If something good came along I'd stay, though."

Hollywood

In the late 1970s Lazenby moved to Hollywood where he started taking acting lessons and set about trying to reactivate his career. "I enjoy the States, to be quite honest about it," he said. "I've got an American wife and green card so I have the best of both worlds."

He appeared in a TV movie Cover Girls (1977).

In 1978 Broccoli described casting Lazenby as "my biggest mistake in 16 years. He just couldn't deal with success. He was so arrogant. There was the stature and looks of a Bond but Lazenby couldn't get along with the other performers and technicians." Sean Connery came to Lazenby's defence saying "I have known George for many years and arrogance is not in his character. Alas I cannot say the same for Cubby Broccoli."

"The interesting thing about that is – I've never met Sean," said Lazenby. "I don't know him at all. Once, years ago, he came to pick up someone who was staying at my house and I saw him through the door. That's all. But I always admired him. I tried to copy him when I played Bond because, after all, I wasn't an actor so I thought my best chance would be to try and be as close to Connery as I could."

Lazenby went on to add:It hasn't been easy, trying to climb back... I admit I acted stupidly. It went to my head, everything that was happening to me. But remember, it was my first film... Now what I've got to do is live down my past; convince people I'm not the same person who made a fool of himself all those years ago. I know I can do it. All I need is the chance.

In 1978, he took out an advertisement in Variety, offering himself for acting work. "If I could get a TV series or a good movie, I swear I'd do it for nothing," he told a journalist. "People ask me if the Bond movie wasn't worth it if it got me into acting. It's true that it got me in, but it wasn't worth the ten years it cost me." The following year, he had a substantial supporting role in Saint Jack (1979), directed by Peter Bogdanovich. 

Lazenby was particularly keen to do The Thorn Birds, but that project was not made until a number of years later and without Lazenby. He did manage to secure roles in Hawaii Five-O and Evening in Byzantium. The latter was seen by Harry Saltzman who offered Lazenby a leading role in a proposed science fiction film The Micronauts. "When I tossed Bond in after one movie he said he'd make sure I never got another job," said Lazenby. "Now he's offering me one. It seems that the 10-year sentence is up. Harry saw me in a TV show I'd recently made for NBC. He rang me up out of the blue and said, 'Now that was a damn lousy show, but one thought that you were ger-reat.' " However the movie was never made.

Lazenby made a guest appearance on the television series Superboy, as an alien disguised as Jor-El, in a two-part episode during the series' second season in 1990. He appeared with Sylvia Kristel in several new Emmanuelle films in 1993, many of which appeared on cable television. In 1993, Lazenby had a part in the film Gettysburg as Confederate General Johnston Pettigrew. 

On 19 September 2013, comedian Jim Jefferies announced on Twitter that Lazenby would be playing his father in the upcoming second season of his FX network sitcom Legit.

In 2019, Lazenby starred as Dr. Jason Love in an audiobook version of James Leasor's spy novel Passport to Oblivion.

Influence on popular culture

Lazenby's single portrayal of the iconic Bond character, and his lack of standing as a favourite in the series, has resulted in his name being used as a metaphor for forgettable, non-iconic acting efforts in other entertainment franchises, and for entities that are largely ignored. In his review of Batman & Robin, widely regarded as the weakest and least successful film in the Batman film franchise, Mick LaSalle of the San Francisco Chronicle said that George Clooney "should go down in history as the George Lazenby of the series". Actor Paul McGann has described himself with good humour as "the George Lazenby of Doctor Who" because, although he has continued in the role of the Eighth Doctor in other media, he made only two appearances on television as the eponymous Time Lord. In a September 2006 episode of The Daily Show, comedian John Oliver suggested that Pope Benedict XVI is the George Lazenby of the papacy, in comparison to "John Paul II's Sean Connery".

In 2009, Sondre Lerche released a song called "Like Lazenby" on his album Heartbeat Radio, in which he laments squandered opportunities wishing for a "second try". Lerche wrote the song after receiving a VHS of the film On Her Majesty's Secret Service as a child, after sending away for a free copy of the movie only to find he had joined a James Bond film club. He got into trouble when his mother was contacted to pay for the membership. Years later, watching the movie again on DVD (with Lazenby's interviews), he found it to be "a perfect metaphor for life's disappointments".

In 2010, Roger Moore, who also played James Bond, provided the voice of a talking cat character named Tab Lazenby in the film Cats & Dogs: The Revenge of Kitty Galore, which contained several references to, and parodies of, Bond films.

Personal life
In 1973, Lazenby married his girlfriend of three years, Chrissie Townson, a member of the Gannett family. They subsequently had two children, Zachary and Melanie. Zachary was diagnosed with a malignant brain tumour when he was eleven and died at 19. Melanie became a real estate broker in New York.

In 2002 Lazenby married former tennis player Pam Shriver. In August 2008, it was reported that Shriver had filed for divorce from Lazenby. Documents filed in Los Angeles Superior Court cite "irreconcilable differences" for the end of the couple's six-year marriage. The couple have three children, including twins born in 2005. Their divorce was finalized in May 2011.

Lazenby lives in Brentwood, Los Angeles. He previously owned a house in Pacific Palisades.

Filmography

Film

Television

Documentaries

Video games

Unmade films
 Deakin (1970) – A western film

Roles originally offered to Lazenby
 James Bond in Diamonds Are Forever (1971), Live And Let Die (1973) and Never Say Never Again (1983) – he turned down Eon's first offer to return, while the second offer was not supported by the director. During a Q&A session at the Sydney 2014 Supanova pop culture expo, Lazenby stated that the reason was because he was too hairy at the time. Kevin McClory considered Lazenby for his rival Bond film but opted for Sean Connery when he agreed to do the film after initially refusing to return to the role.
 the role played by James Coburn in Duck, You Sucker! (1971) – he turned it down
 the part played by Gig Young in Game of Death (1978)
 John Cleese said he wanted to cast Lazenby as Jesus Christ in The Life of Brian

Notes 
 Cy Endfield directed the Big Fry commercial. Sean Connery had worked with this director on Hell Drivers, 1957.

References

External links

 
 
 George Lazenby at the National Film and Sound Archive
 2005 interview Swindon Web, 10 June 2005
 Aushenker, Michael. "'Bond'-ing with George Lazenby" Palisadian-Post, 26 November 2008
 "Bond star bedded 'a woman a day'" Stuff, 11 September 2010

1939 births
Living people
20th-century Australian male actors
21st-century Australian male actors
Alumni of the College of the Venerable Bede, Durham
Australian expatriate male actors in the United States
Australian expatriates in the United States
Australian male film actors
Australian male models
Australian male television actors
Australian male voice actors
Australian people of British descent
Australian people of English descent
Male actors from New South Wales
People from Goulburn
People from Queanbeyan